Bank Chor is a 2017 Indian Hindi-language black comedy film directed by Bumpy, written by Baljeet Singh Marwah and produced by Ashish Patil. The film was produced by Y-Films and distributed by Yash Raj Films. The film stars Riteish Deshmukh and Rhea Chakraborty, with Vivek Oberoi in a substantial role. Oberoi has returned to Yash Raj Films after 15 years, his last film under their banner was Saathiya. The film was released on 16 June 2017.

Plot

The plot starts with a simple Marathi manoos and a Vaastu adherent, Champak Chandrakant Chiplunkar (Riteish Deshmukh), who is planning to rob a local bank in Mumbai. Two of his friends, Genda (Vikram Thapa) and Gulab (Bhuvan Arora), assist him in orchestrating the robbery. In preparation for the heist, Champak disguises himself as a sadhu and his accomplices wear elephant and horse masks. The bandits successfully make it past the bank's security carrying weapons, thereafter taking over the entire bank at gunpoint. But the heist soon unravels rather haphazardly, resulting in the robbers seizing twenty-eight individuals inside the bank hostage.

Among the hostages inside the bank, consisting of seventeen men and eleven women, are bank staff and customers, including a nervous housewife, a sassy female bank teller, a hyperactive male chef, the rapper Baba Sehgal and Jugnu (Sahil Vaid) who is purporting to be a Faizabadi undercover police officer on duty.

Powerless and defenseless, each hostage is soon tied up with his (or her) hands zip-tied behind his (or her) back. The robbers bundle the bound hostages into a back room and force the manager to open the vault. Champak continues composing stories to persuade the hostages about his white-collar class foundation to compensate for the fortune that has evaded him. In any case, things get off-track rapidly, making the bank robbers run into Amjad Khan (Vivek Oberoi) who is a heartless and tough CBI officer with a “shoot first ask questions later” attitude. The CBI officer threatens to use force against the bank robbers, giving them a one-hour deadline to surrender and not caring about the hostages’ lives if the deadline expires.

In the midst of everything occurring inside the bank, there is a much larger plot unfolding as the Indian Minister of Home Affairs takes an interest in the bank robbery; there is a disk inside the bank with compromising information that threatens to destroy his political career. There is also the expected mad-media circus outside the bank led by crime reporter Gayatri Ganguly aka Gaga (Rhea Chakraborty) whose idol in the movie is Arnab Goswami.

Eventually, Champak and his accomplices decided to end the bank robbery and free the bank staff and customers, removing the zip-ties fastening their hands behind their backs and letting them all go. But just as the hostages are about to exit the bank, one of them, Jugnu reveals himself to be a ruthless bank robber who is secretly working for the Indian Home Minister to procure the compromising disc that threatens to expose him in a political scandal. In a transition of power from the old bank robbers to the new bank robbers, Jugnu and his fellow perpetrators hijack the bank at gunpoint, shooting and seriously wounding an elderly male hostage and taking the original bank robbers, Champak and his accomplices, as their own hostages in a new bank robbery. As the sands of power inside the bank shift from Champak to Jugnu, Jugnu forces the old bank robbers to assist him and his team with their own bank heist.

In the meantime, the twenty-seven remaining bank staff and customers are forced to transition from being Champak's hostages to becoming Jugnu's hostages. The ruthless new bank robbers force the hostages to kneel on the ground; each bank employee and customer is now compelled to keep his (or her) hands behind his (or her) head at all times.

While all this chaos is unfolding, Amjad Khan discovers that Champak is no longer the real bank robber but his efforts to investigate the bank robbery are thwarted as the corrupt Minister for Home Affairs orders the investigation of the ongoing bank robbery transferred from the CBI to the local Mumbai police in an effort to help Jugnu.

At one point the CBI officer is invited to enter the bank to check that all the hostages are still alive and safe. The CBI officer enters the premises to discover the terrified bank staff and customers inside a back room, all compelled to sit on the floor with their hands behind their heads. During this time Jugnu instructs Champak to try and fool the CBI officer by pretending that he (i.e. Champak) is still the bank robber and that he (i.e. Jugnu) is still a hostage. At this point, Champak offers to let the CBI officer take the injured elderly male hostage for medical treatment. When the CBI officer leaves, Jugnu beats up Champak for letting one of the hostages go, much to the alarm and fright of the remaining hostages.

Eventually, Champak and his partners outwit Jugnu and his accomplices and help free all the captives inside the bank. In an act of chivalry, Champak and his team help free the female hostages first. But eventually, all the hostages are freed. The released bank workers and customers embrace Champak and his partners as their heroes for saving their lives. Jugnu is ultimately captured. The corrupt Minister for Home Affairs is exposed when the information on the disk inside the bank becomes public knowledge.

At the end, it is revealed that the three who freed the hostages were the actual bank robbers who robbed many banks and all the work done by them was a part to expose the home minister who killed his partner who was a journalist while he was gathering evidence against the home minister. They were also the actual persons who ran away with the money. Amjad Khan admits that they are the only robbers whose mind he could not read.

Cast 
 Riteish Deshmukh as Champak
 Vivek Oberoi as CBI Officer Amjad Khan
 Vikram Thapa as Genda
 Rhea Chakraborty as Gayatri Ganguly, a journalist
 Sahil Vaid as Jugnu
 Bhuvan Arora as Gulab
 Baba Sehgal as himself
 Naveen Kaushik
 Kavish Majumdar as Mukesh
 Vikram Gokhale
 Upendra Limaye
 Harpal Singh Sokhi

Critical Reception
On review aggregator Rotten Tomatoes, the film holds an approval rating of 11%, based on nine reviews with an average rating of 3.5/10.

Soundtrack 
The soundtrack was released on 24 May 2017 by YRF Music.

References

External links
 

2017 films
2017 action comedy films
2017 black comedy films
2010s heist films
Indian action comedy films
Indian black comedy films
Indian heist films
Films scored by Shamir Tandon
2010s Hindi-language films